Christian McGaffney (born 8 April 1989 in Liverpool, England) is a Venezuelan actor, recognized by his performances in both theater and television. He played David in the RTI/Televisa co-production called La virgen de la calle, and role of Andy, the character in the theater play HIGH (Alto).

Career
He started his acting career in 2005 in Con Toda El Alma, a teen series produced by Laura Visconti and transmitted by Venevisión. He has worked in many soap operas, such as Voltea pa' que te enamores, ("Turn your Face to Fall in Love") Torrente, (Torrent"), Un esposo para Estela, (A Husband for Estela"),  Natalia del mar, Las bandidas (The She-Bandits) and La virgen de la calle (The Virgin of the Street). All of them have been transmitted throughout the whole Latin America and the rest of the world.

Besides, he has taken part in several theater plays, such as Los Cuentos Mágicos del Zapatero, ("The Magical Stories of the Shoe Man"), Actos Indecentes: Los tres juicios a Óscar Wilde, ("Gross Indecency: The Three Trials of Oscar Wilde), Toc-Toc and HIGH. This latter represented Venezuela at the Ibero American Theater Festival in Bogotá, year 2012.

McGaffney starred in the musical video "Más Cerquita" by Famasloop, which was nominated for the 2013 Latin Grammy Awards and was very well received in Venezuela.

Personal life

In January 2020, McGaffney married the actress María Gabriela de Faría.

References

Venezuelan male television actors
Venezuelan male film actors
Venezuelan male stage actors
1989 births
Living people
Male actors from Liverpool
English emigrants to Venezuela